Mortel Transfert is a Franco-German thriller, directed by Jean-Jacques Beineix, adapted from the novel of the same name by Jean-Pierre Gattégno.  The music was provided by the composer of Roselyne et les lions, Reinhardt Wagner.

Cast
 Jean-Hugues Anglade as Michel Durand
 Hélène de Fougerolles as Olga Kubler
 Miki Manojlovic as Erostrate
 Valentina Sauca as Hélène Maier
 Robert Hirsch as Armand Slibovic
 Yves Rénier as Max Kubler
 Catherine Mouchet as The professor of maths
 Denis Podalydès as Commissioner Chapireau
 Riton Liebman as The disc-jockey

References

External links
 

2001 films
2001 thriller films
French thriller films
German thriller films
Films directed by Jean-Jacques Beineix
2000s French films
2000s German films